There are several lakes named Mud Lake within the U.S. state of Wyoming.

 Mud Lake, Big Horn County, Wyoming.	
 Mud Lake, Fremont County, Wyoming.	
 Mud Lake, Fremont County, Wyoming.	
 Mud Lake, Fremont County, Wyoming.	
 Mud Lake, Fremont County, Wyoming.	
 Mud Lake, Natrona County, Wyoming.	
 Mud Lake, Sublette County, Wyoming.	
 Mud Lake, Sublette County, Wyoming.	
 Halls Lake, also known as  Mud Lake, Sublette County, Wyoming.	
 Mud Lake, Sublette County, Wyoming.	
 Mud Lake, Sublette County, Wyoming.	
 Red Lake, also known as  Mud Lake, Sweetwater County, Wyoming.	
 Mud Lake, Sweetwater County, Wyoming.	
 Mud Lake, Teton County, Wyoming.

References
 USGS-U.S. Board on Geographic Names

External links
 GNIS Query 

Lakes of Wyoming